Dinajpur is a city in Dinajpur District, Bangladesh.

Dinajpur may also refer to:

Bangladesh
Dinajpur District, Bangladesh
Dinajpur Sadar Upazila, eponymous upazila of Dinajpur District

India
West Dinajpur district, a former district of West Bengal, India
North Dinajpur, a current district formed out of West Dinajpur 
South Dinajpur, a current district formed out of West Dinajpur